The 1971 Pacific Tigers football team represented the University of the Pacific (UOP) in the 1971 NCAA University Division football season as a member of the Pacific Coast Athletic Association.

Led by second-year head coach Homer Smith, the Tigers played home games at Pacific Memorial Stadium in Stockton, California. They finished the season at 3–8 (1–4 in PCAA, sixth), and were outscored 176–198.

Schedule

Notes

References

Pacific
Pacific Tigers football seasons
Pacific Tigers football